Dvorce (in 1869–1910 Dvorec) is a municipality and village in Bruntál District in the Moravian-Silesian Region of the Czech Republic. It has about 1,300 inhabitants.

Administrative parts
The village of Rejchartice is an administrative part of Dvorce.

Geography
It lies in the Nízký Jeseník mountain range. The Lobník Stream flows through the municipality.

History
According to legends, Dvorce was founded at the beginning of the 10th century, however the first written mention of Dvorce is from 1339. In 1363 Dvorce was first referred to as a market town and in 1406 it is referred to as a town. The first written mention of Rejhartice is from 1410.

Until 1918, Hof in Mähren was part of the Austrian monarchy (Austria side after the compromise of 1867), in the Sternberg (Šternberk) district, one of the 34 Bezirkshauptmannschaften in Moravia.

In 1938, after the Munich Agreement, it was annexed by the Nazi Germany and administered as a part of Reichsgau Sudetenland, as one of the 6 towns of County Bärn. The German speaking population was expelled in 1945 according to the Beneš decrees and replaced by Czech settlers.

In 1945 the municipality of Dvorce lost the town status.

Notable people
Wilhelm Jahn (1835–1900), Austrian conductor
Friedrich Materna (1885–1946), German general

Twin towns – sister cities

Dvorce is twinned with:
 Strzeleczki, Poland

Gallery

References

External links

Villages in Bruntál District